Mecistogaster ornata is a species of narrow-winged damselfly in the family Coenagrionidae. It is found in Central America and South America.

The IUCN conservation status of Mecistogaster ornata is "LC", least concern, with no immediate threat to the species' survival. The IUCN status was reviewed in 2009.

Subspecies
These two subspecies belong to the species Mecistogaster ornata:
 Mecistogaster ornata acutipennis Selys, 1886
 Mecistogaster ornata ornata Rambur, 1842

References

Further reading

 

Coenagrionidae
Articles created by Qbugbot
Insects described in 1842